Wolftown Committee was a collaboration between hip hop artists on the Wolftown Recordings artist roster.

The 10-pieces group included The Villains, Vicious Circle, Jai Boo, and Tricksta.

They released their first single, Artform Technique (Original & Remix) / Could It Be in February 2002. This was followed by the 21 track LP Legendary Status later in the year. The album was followed by a 2003 single release, Boxed.

Discography 
Singles
Artform Technique (Original & Remix) / Could It Be (2002) (Wolftown Recordings)
 Boxed (2003) (Wolftown Recordings)
Albums
Legendary Status (2002) (Wolftown Recordings)

References

English hip hop groups